Bat Out of Hell II: Picture Show is a 1994 music video by Meat Loaf. Besides the three music videos directed by Michael Bay for the singles from Bat Out of Hell II: Back into Hell, the video contains three live performances and interviews with Meat Loaf and songwriter/producer Jim Steinman. Until the release of the 2006 Collectors Edition of Bat Out of Hell II, this was the only official release of the video clips.

Track listing 
 "I'd Do Anything for Love (But I Won't Do That)" (live performance) — 7:29
 "Rock and Roll Dreams Come Through" (full length video) — 5:46
 "Life Is a Lemon and I Want My Money Back" (live performance) — 8:41
 "Objects in the Rear View Mirror May Appear Closer than They Are" (full length video) — 7:42
 "Paradise by the Dashboard Light" (live performance) — 10:18
 "I'd Do Anything for Love (But I Won't Do That)" (full length video) — 7:43

 All songs written, arranged and produced by Jim Steinman
 Videos directed by Micheal Bay
 Live performances courtesy of VH1 / MTV Networks

Meat Loaf Musicians 
 Meat Loaf: Lead Vocals
 Patti Russo: Female Lead and Backing Vocals (credited as Patricia Rousseau)
 Pat Thrall: Guitars, Backing Vocals
 Kasim Sulton: Guitars, Keyboards, Backing Vocals
 Steve Buslowe: Bass, Backing Vocals, Music Director
 Mark Alexander: Piano, Backing Vocals
 John Miceli: Drums

Certifications

References

Meat Loaf video albums
1993 video albums
Music video compilation albums
1993 compilation albums